The volcanic activity in the South Island of New Zealand terminated 5 million years ago as the more northern parts of the North Island became extremely volcanically active.  The South Islands surface geology reflects the uplift of the Pacific Plate as it collides with the Indo-Australian Plate along the Alpine Fault over the last 12 million years and the termination of subduction, about 100 to 105 million years ago. There is a very small chance of reactivation of volcanism in the Dunedin Volcano. This chance is made slightly higher by the observation that Southland's Solander Islands / Hautere just off the coast of the South Island were active as recently as 150,000 years old.

Geology
The South Island portion of Zealandia is divided from the point of view of basement rocks into an older "Western Province", consisting mainly of greywacke, granite and gneiss, down the West Coast and in a swing to Steward Island and an "Eastern Province", consisting mainly of younger greywacke and schist. These basements can be exposed but will not be considered further in this article and the sediments that overlay them and were often uplifted and tilted with the volcanics and penetrated, covered or interleaved by them up to 5 million years ago will only be considered in passing. For more detail see the Geology of New Zealand. 

 
The Mount Somers Volcanic Group (Mount Somers Volcanics) which are predominately andesitic and rhyolitic with ignimbrite, overlay the Rakaia terrane of the Torlesse Composite Terrane and extend from the Mount Somers region to the Banks Peninsula and are in the formation age range 100 to 80 million years ago. Accordingly later sedimentary and volcanic deposits overlay them in many areas not related to the rifting events that formed these volcanics rather like happened in the North Island Coromandel Volcanic Zone 20 to 5  million years ago and is now happening with the Taupō Rift and its associated very active Taupō Volcanic Zone.

Around 40 million years ago the undersea sedimentary basin in what is now eastern north Otago had basaltic activity and in due course with uplift the layered volcanics on present land tended to resist erosion so are now the surface deposits of what is termed the Waiareka-Deborah volcanic field. There are known to be many still undersea basaltic volcanics off the east coast such as the Maahunui volcanic field but ages are not assigned to most which are likely to be in the range 40 to 10 million years ago. The Maahunui volcanic field terminated activity 11 million years ago and is potentially associated with the similar timing Banks Volcanco. 

In the period from 20 to 5 million years ago two large basalt shield volcanoes, the Banks Peninsula Volcano which also has trachytic elements  and the Dunedin Volcano which also has trachytic, olivine and phonolite elements erupted. The other main area of now land volcanism was what was termed the Waipiata basaltic monogenetic volcanic field Most of these volcanics turned out to have similar age and alkali lavas to the Dunedin Volcano so are now classified in the Dunedin volcanic group. In north Otago there is indeed overlap  and at least two much later Dunedin volcanic group eruptives are on top of 20 million years ago earlier Waiareka-Deborah volcanic field eruptives.  

The uplift of the Southern Alps has also exposed intrusive dykes and other formations which were possibly never surface volcanism but are important as composition and timing in the south are similar to those of the Dunedin volcanic group.

Volcanic areas

Banks Peninsula 

Banks Peninsula comprises the eroded remnants of two large stratovolcanoes, Lyttelton, which formed first, and Akaroa. These formed by intraplate volcanism through continental crust approximately eleven to eight million years ago (Miocene). The peninsula formed as offshore islands, with the volcanoes reaching to about 1,500 m above sea level. Two dominant craters were eroded, then flooded, to form the Lyttelton and Akaroa Harbours. The portion of crater rim lying between Lyttelton Harbour and Christchurch city forms the Port Hills.

Oamaru 

Small sub-alkaline basalt to basaltic andesite Surtseyan volcanoes on the submerged continental shelf formed what was historically termed the Waiareka-Deborah volcanic group and now called the Waiareka-Deborah volcanic field in the area around Oamaru around 35 to 30 million years ago. A monogenetic volcanic field of more alkaline composition eruptives, with stronger surface features, as they are younger, extends north of Dunedin overlapping the southern Waiareka-Deborah volcanic field, and these volcanoes have now been characterised to be part of the Dunedin volcanic group.

Southern Alps 

The Alpine Dyke Swarm of volcanic intusion took place about 25 million years ago and is located near Lake Wanaka in the Southern Alps.

Dunedin 

The Dunedin Volcano formed during the Miocene, beginning with basaltic eruptions on the Otago Peninsula is the largest volcano in the large Dunedin volcanic group. Large central-vent structures formed, and then large domes, with seawater interacting explosively with erupting submarine magma.

Attribution

Copied content from Volcanism of New Zealand on pages creation date; see Volcanism of New Zealand: Revision history for attribution.

References

Back-arc basins
Subduction volcanoes
Volcanic belts
Volcanoes of New Zealand